Yerilda Alexandra Zapata Rodríguez (born 3 January 1998) is a Venezuelan athlete who specializes in discus throw. She set the Venezuelan national junior records in both discus and shot put.

Early life
Yerilda Alexandra Zapata Rodríguez was born in Anzoátegui, Venezuela, on 3 January 1998 to Yuliesy Rodríguez and former boxer Pedro Zapata. She was raised in a ranchito (shack) in the Altavista area (compared to a favela) of Pozuelos, near Puerto la Cruz, where her father worked in the oil industry. She is one of six siblings, and her elder half-sister is triple jumper Yulimar Rojas. She has been trained by Ramón Salazar since 2008.

Career
At the 2012 Venezuelan School Games, Zapata competed in the U14 discus and javelin.

She came second at the 2015 Central American and Caribbean School Games, throwing  in the discus, and took bronze at the 2015 Ibero-American Junior Championships in Athletics.

She won the gold in discus at the 2017, 2018 and 2019 Venezuelan National Championships.

Zapata's ambition is to go to the Olympic Games and, with Rojas, become the first siblings to win medals for Venezuela, something which Rojas has also expressed a desire to achieve.

Personal bests
Source:
Shot put:  (2017)
Shot put (3kg):  (2015)
Discus throw:  (2020)

Records held
Venezuelan junior record in women's discus throw (since 2015)
Venezuelan junior record in women's shot put (since 2015)

References

1998 births
Living people
Athletes (track and field) at the 2014 Summer Youth Olympics
People from Anzoátegui
Venezuelan female discus throwers
Venezuelan female shot putters
21st-century Venezuelan women